The Schock 34 GP (Grand Prix) is an American sailboat that was designed by Bruce Nelson and Bruce Marek as an International Offshore Rule racer and first built in 1985.

The boat is a lightweight racing development of the Schock 34 PC with an  lighter hull and a  taller mast.

Production
The design was built by W. D. Schock Corp in the United States. Only three boats were built, all in 1985 and it is now out of production.

Design
The Schock 34 GP is a racing keelboat, built predominantly of fiberglass. It has a masthead sloop rig, a raked stem , a reverse transom, an internally mounted spade-type rudder controlled by a wheel and a fixed fin keel. It displaces  and carries  of lead ballast.

Operational history
In a 1987 review in Yachting magazine Chris Caswell wrote, "Pick the 34-GP (Grand Prix), and you get everything Nelson/Marek has learned about winning ocean races: a low-profile cabin, wide cockpit bisected by a husky traveler, dotted with two-speed winches and swept by along tiller, a tall double-spreader rig, and a stark interior best suited for young men intent on winning races and nothing else. Scott Allan won YACHTING’s Block Island Race Week with an early 34-GP, and Dave Ullman has been tearing up the West Coast, including the prestigious Whitney Series, with another."

See also
List of sailing boat types

Related development
 Schock 34 PC

References

External links
Photo of a Schock 34 GP

Keelboats
1980s sailboat type designs
Sailing yachts
Sailboat type designs by Bruce Nelson
Sailboat type designs by Bruce Marek
Sailboat types built by W. D. Schock Corp